Senator Grant may refer to:

Johnny Grant (politician), Georgia State Senate
Levi Grant (1810–1891), Wisconsin State Senate
Norman Grant (politician), Senate of Jamaica
Robert Y. Grant (1819–1862), New York State Senate